London Centre is a defunct Ontario provincial electoral district that was abolished in 1996. Its most notable representative was former Liberal Premier David Peterson, and was located in London, Ontario.

Boundaries
Just prior to the 1975 election, the riding of London Centre was created. It consisted of the following boundary: commencing at the intersection of the Thames River and Highbury Avenue it went north along Highbury Avenue to Huron Street, west to Adelaide Street and then north to the North Thames River. It then went southwest following the river to Wharncliffe Road North and then south to Essex Street, then west to Platts Lane and south to Oxford Street. It then went east to Woodward Avenue and south to Mount Pleasant Avenue and then west to the Canadian National Railway line. It followed the railway southeast to the Thames River and then southeast following the river back to Highbury Avenue. Minor changes were made in 1986 but essentially the riding still occupied the central part of the city.

In 1996, a major electoral riding redistribution occurred which abolished the riding. Overall 130 seats were reduced to 103 which harmonized the provincial riding boundaries with those of the already existing federal ridings. A large portion of the riding was incorporated into the new riding of London North Centre. The southeast corner of the riding was incorporated into the riding of London—Fanshawe.

Members of Provincial Parliament

Electoral history

References

Former provincial electoral districts of Ontario